A building society is a financial institution owned by its members as a mutual organization. Building societies offer banking and related financial services, especially savings and mortgage lending. Building societies exist in the United Kingdom, Australia and New Zealand, and used to exist in Ireland and several Commonwealth countries. They are similar to credit unions in organisation, though few enforce a common bond. However, rather than promoting thrift and offering unsecured and business loans, the purpose of a building society is to provide home mortgages to members. Borrowers and depositors are society members, setting policy and appointing directors on a one-member, one-vote basis. Building societies often provide other retail banking services, such as current accounts, credit cards and personal loans. The term "building society" first arose in the 19th century in Great Britain from cooperative savings groups.

In the United Kingdom, building societies actively compete with banks for most consumer banking services, especially mortgage lending and savings accounts, and regulations permit up to half of their lending to be funded by debt to non-members, allowing societies to access wholesale bond and money markets to fund mortgages. The world's largest building society is Britain's Nationwide Building Society. Further, in Australia, building societies also compete with retail banks and offer the full range of banking services to consumers.

History in the United Kingdom 
Building societies as an institution began in late-18th century Birmingham – a town which was undergoing rapid economic and physical expansion driven by a multiplicity of small metalworking firms, whose many highly skilled and prosperous owners readily invested in property. Many of the early building societies were based in taverns or coffeehouses, which had become the focus for a network of clubs and societies for co-operation and the exchange of ideas among Birmingham's highly active citizenry as part of the movement known as the Midlands Enlightenment. The first building society to be established was Ketley's Building Society, founded by Richard Ketley, the landlord of the Golden Cross inn, in 1775. Members of Ketley's society paid a monthly subscription to a central pool of funds which was used to finance the building of houses for members, which in turn acted as collateral to attract further funding to the society, enabling further construction. By 1781 three more societies had been established in Birmingham, with a fourth in the nearby town of Dudley; and 19 more formed in Birmingham between 1782 and 1795. The first outside the English Midlands was established in Leeds in 1785.

Most of the original societies were fully terminating, where they would be dissolved when all members had a house: the last of them, First Salisbury and District Perfect Thrift Building Society, was wound up in March 1980. In the 1830s and 1840s a new development took place with the permanent building society, where the society continued on a rolling basis, continually taking in new members as earlier ones completed purchases, such as Leek Building Society. The main legislative framework for the building society was the Building Societies Act 1874, with subsequent amending legislation in 1894, 1939 (see Coney Hall), and 1960.

In their heyday, there were hundreds of building societies: just about every town in the country had a building society named after that town. Over succeeding decades the number of societies has decreased, as various societies merged to form larger ones, often renaming in the process, and other societies opted for demutualisation followed by – in the great majority of cases – eventual takeover by a listed bank. Most of the existing larger building societies are the end result of the mergers of many smaller societies.

All building societies in the UK are members of the Building Societies Association. At the start of 2008, there were 59 building societies in the UK, with total assets exceeding £360 billion. The number of societies in the UK fell by four during 2008 due to a series of mergers brought about, to a large extent, by the consequences of the financial crisis of 2007–2008. With three further mergers in each of 2009 and 2010, and a demutualisation and a merger in 2011, as of 2020 there are now 44 building societies.

Demutualisation

In the 1980s, changes to British banking laws allowed building societies to offer banking services equivalent to normal banks. The management of a number of societies still felt that they were unable to compete with the banks, and a new Building Societies Act was passed in 1986 in response to their concerns. This permitted societies to 'demutualise'. If more than 75% of members voted in favour, the building society would then become a limited company like any other. Members' mutual rights were exchanged for shares in this new company. A number of the larger societies made such proposals to their members and all were accepted. Some listed on the London Stock Exchange, while others were acquired by larger financial groups.

The process began with the demutualisation of the Abbey National Building Society in 1989. Then, from 1995 to late 1999, eight societies demutualised accounting for two-thirds of building societies assets as at 1994. Five of these societies became joint stock banks (plc), one merged with another and the other four were taken over by plcs (in two cases after the mutual had previously converted to a plc).

As  mentions, demutualisation moves succeeded immediately because neither Conservative nor Labour party UK governments created a framework which put obstacles in the way of demutualisation. Political acquiescence in demutualisation was clearest in the case of the position on 'carpetbaggers', that is those who joined societies by lodging minimum amounts of £100 or so in the hope of profiting from a distribution of surplus after demutualisation. The deregulating Building Societies Act 1986 contained an anti-carpetbagger provision in the form of a two-year rule. This prescribed a qualifying period of two years before savers could participate in a residual claim. But, before the 1989 Abbey National Building Society demutualisation, the courts found against the two-year rule after legal action brought by Abbey National itself to circumvent the intent of the legislators. After this the legislation did prevent a cash distribution to members of less than two years standing, but the same result was obtained by permitting the issue of 'free' shares in the acquiring plc, saleable for cash. The Thatcher Conservative government declined to introduce amending legislation to make good the defect in the 'two-year rule'.

1980s and 1990s
Building societies, like mutual life insurers, arose as people clubbed together to address a common need interest; in the case of the building societies, this was housing and members were originally both savers and borrowers. But it very quickly became clear that 'outsider' savers were needed whose motive was profit through interest on deposits. Thus permanent building societies quickly became mortgage banks and in such institutions there always existed a conflict of interest between borrowers and savers. It was the task of the movement to reconcile that conflict of interest so as to enable savers to conclude that their interests and those of borrowers were to some extent complementary rather than conflictive. Conflict of interest between savers and borrowers was never fully reconciled in the building societies but upon deregulation that reconciliation became something of a lost cause. The management of building societies apparently could expend considerable time and resources (which belonged the organisation) planning their effective capture—of as much of the assets as they could. If so, this is arguably insider dealing on a grand scale with the benefit of inside specialist knowledge of the business and resources of the firm not shared with outsiders like politicians and members (and, perhaps, regulators). Once the opportunity to claim was presented by management the savers in particular could be relied upon to seize it. There were sufficient hard-up borrowers to take the inducement offered them by management (in spite of few simple sums sufficing to demonstrate that they were probably going to end up effectively paying back the inducement). 

Management promoting demutualisation also thereby met managerial objectives because the end of mutuality brought joint stock company (plc) style remuneration committee pay standards and share options. Share options for management of converting societies appear to be a powerful factor in management calculation.  refers to this in the following terms:

Instead of deploying their margin advantage as a defence of mutuality, around 1980 building societies began setting mortgage rates with reference to market clearing levels. In sum they began behaving more like banks, seeking to maximise profit instead of the advantages of a mutual organisation. Thus, according to the Bank of England's :

As  also observe:

 draws a rather more direct and cynical conclusion:

Some of these managements ended up in dispute with their own members. Of the first major conversion of the Abbey in 1989,  observed:

In the end, after a number of large demutualisations, and pressure from carpetbaggers moving from one building society to another to cream off the windfalls, most of the societies whose management wished to keep them mutual modified their rules of membership in the late 1990s. The method usually adopted were membership rules to ensure that anyone newly joining a society would, for the first few years, be unable to get any profit out of a demutualisation. With the chance of a quick profit removed, the wave of demutualisations came to an end in 2000.

One academic study  found that demutualised societies' pricing behaviour on deposits and mortgages was more favourable to shareholders than to customers, with the remaining mutual building societies offering consistently better rates.

2000s and 2010s
The Building Societies (Funding) and Mutual Societies (Transfers) Act 2007, known as the Butterfill Act, was passed in 2007 giving building societies greater powers to merge with other companies. These powers have been used by the Britannia in 2009 and Kent Reliance in 2011 leading to their demutualisation.

Prior to 31 December 2010, deposits with building societies of up to £50,000 per individual, per institution, were normally protected by the Financial Services Compensation Scheme (FSCS), but Nationwide and Yorkshire building societies negotiated a temporary change to the terms of the FSCS to protect members of the societies they acquired in late 2008/early 2009. The amended terms allowed former members of multiple societies which merge into one to maintain multiple entitlements to FSCS protection until 30 September 2009 (later extended to 30 December 2010), so (for example) a member with £50,000 in each of Nationwide, Cheshire and Derbyshire at the time of the respective mergers would retain £150,000 of FSCS protection for their funds in the merged Nationwide. On 31 December 2010 the general FSCS limit for retail deposits was increased to £85,000 for banks and building societies and the transitional arrangements in respect of building society mergers came to an end.

List of building societies

United Kingdom

Current

(Total group assets of building societies) (data from last available annual reports as of December 2016)

Source: Building Societies Association updated for subsequent mergers

Demutualised
Ten building societies of the United Kingdom demutualised between 1989 and 2000, either becoming a bank or being acquired by a larger bank. By 2008, every building society that floated on the stock market in the wave of demutualisations of the 1980s and 1990s had either been sold to a conventional bank, or been nationalised.

No longer exist
The following is an incomplete list of building societies in the United Kingdom that no longer exist independently, since they either merged with or were taken over by other organisations. They may still have an active presence on the high street (or online) as a trading name or as a distinct brand. This is typically because brands will often build up specific reputations and attract certain clientele, and this can continue to be marketed successfully.

Australia 
In Australia, building societies evolved along British lines. Following the end of World War II, the terminating model was revived to fund returning servicemen's need for new houses. Hundreds were created with government seed capital, whereby the capital was returned to the government and the terminating societies retained the interest accumulated. Once all the seed funds were loaned, each terminating society could reapply for more seed capital to the point where they could re-lend their own funds and thus became a permanent society. Terminating loans were still available and used inside the permanent businesses by staff up until the 1980s because their existence was not widely known after the early 1960s. Because of strict regulations on banks, building societies flourished until the deregulation of the Australian financial industry in the 1980s. Eventually many of the smaller building societies disappeared, while some of the largest (such as St. George) officially attained the status of banks. Recent conversions have included Heritage Bank which converted from building society to bank in 2011, Hume in 2014, while Wide Bay Building Society became Auswide Bank and IMB followed suit in 2015, and Greater Building Society became Greater Bank in 2016. Building societies converting to banks are no longer required to demutualise.

A particular difference between Australian building societies and those elsewhere, is that Australian building societies are required to incorporate as limited companies.

Current building societies are
Bass & Equitable Building Society (Tasmania)
Maitland Mutual Building Society (Maitland)
Newcastle Permanent Building Society (Newcastle)

Eswatini 
The Building Societies Act of 1962 allowed for the registration of building societies in Eswatini. For a long time the country only had one building society.  A second was registered in late 2019.

Swaziland Building Society: Registered in the 1960s, this is the first and oldest building society in Eswatini. It has branches in almost every town and city within the Kingdom and has been known to be conservative. There have been many rumours of this institution wishing to demutualise to the extent that an amendment to the Building Societies Act was passed in 2019 permitting building societies to demutualise and apply for banking licences.
Status Capital Building Society: Status Capital Building Society was registered as the country's second building society and granted a licence in 2019 by the Financial Services Regulatory Authority after approval and recommendation from the Minister of Finance.

Ireland 
The Republic of Ireland had around 40 building societies at the mid-20th century peak. Many of these were very small and, as the Irish commercial banks began to originate residential mortgages, the small building societies ceased to be competitive. Most merged or dissolved or, in the case of First Active plc, converted into conventional banks. The last remaining building societies, EBS Building Society and Irish Nationwide Building Society, demutualised and were transferred or acquired into Bank subsidiaries in 2011 following the effects of the Irish financial crisis.

Leeds Building Society Ireland and Nationwide UK (Ireland) were Irish branches of a building societies based in the United Kingdom; both have since ceased all Irish operations.

Society closures
 Ballygall Building Society, 1977
 City and Provincial Building Society, 1978
 Dublin Model Building Society, 1984
 Dublin Savings Building Society, 1977
 Four Provinces Building Society, 1978
 Independent Building Society, 1977
 Irish Savings Building Society, 1984
 National Provincial Building Society, 1977
 Progressive Building Society, 1977
 West of Ireland Building Society, 1977

Jamaica 
In Jamaica, three building societies compete with commercial banks and credit unions for most consumer financial services:

Jamaica National Building Society
Victoria Mutual Building Society
Scotia Jamaica Building Society

New Zealand

Regulation
In New Zealand, building societies are registered with the Registrar of Building Societies under the Building Societies Act 1965. Registration as a building society is merely a process of establishing the entity as a corporation. It is largely a formality, and easily achieved, as the capital requirement is minimal (20 members must be issued shares of not less than NZ$1,000 each, for a total minimum foundation share capital of NZ$200,000).

As regards prudential supervision, a divide exists between building societies that operate in New Zealand, on the one hand, and those that (although formally registered in New Zealand) operate offshore:
 Building societies that accept deposits from members of the public in New Zealand are regulated as "non-bank deposit takers" under the Non-bank Deposit Takers Act 2013. Such building societies must (unless they qualify for a particular exemption) comply with the prudential regulations. The Reserve Bank of New Zealand monitors compliance with the prudential regulations, but does not prudentially supervise individual building societies for financial soundness. Most such building societies are supervised for compliance with the terms of their debt securities by trustees appointed under securities legislation, and those trustees have various reporting requirements to the Reserve Bank.
 Building societies that accept deposits only from offshore customers are not regulated under the Non-bank Deposit Takers Act 2013 or New Zealand's financial markets legislation. Consequently, they are not prudentially monitored by the Reserve Bank or by the Financial Markets Authority. The Reserve Bank cautions on its website that it does not monitor transactions undertaken by New Zealand registered building societies operating in overseas markets.  The Department of Internal Affairs is ultimately responsible for all entities that do not expressly fall into other categories for anti money laundering purposes.

Building societies' registration details and filed documents are available in the Register of Building Societies held at the New Zealand Companies Office.

Individual building societies
Over the years, a number of building societies were established.

Some, including Countrywide Building Society and United Building Society, became banks in the 1980s and 1990s.  Heartland Building Society (created in 2011 through a merger of Canterbury Building Society, Southern Cross Building Society, and two other financial institutions) became Heartland Bank on 17 December 2012.

Remaining building societies include:
 Pacific Eagle Capital (formerly General Equity Building Society) 
 Heretaunga Building Society
 Kiwi Deposit Building Society (in the process of dissolution since 2013)
 Manawatu Permanent Building Society 
 Nelson Building Society
 Southland Building Society, which in October 2008 became a registered bank known as SBS Bank. However, it remains a building society and retains its mutual structure.
 Hastings Building Society merged with SBS Bank in October 2010, but with the Hastings Building Society brand continuing to operate as a building society under the name of HBS Bank.  In November 2015, HBS Bank brand was discontinued.
 Wairarapa Building Society.

Zimbabwe 
In Zimbabwe, Central Africa Building Society (CABS) is the leading building society offering a diverse range of financial products and services that include transaction and savings accounts, mobile banking, mortgage loans, money market investments, term deposits and pay-roll loans.

Similar organisations in other countries
In other countries there are mutual organisations similar to building societies:
Austria: In Austria there are four co-operative banks: Allgemeine Bausparkasse (ABV), Raiffeisen-Bausparkasse, Bausparkasse Wüstenrot AG and Bausparkasse der Sparkassen (savings bank).
Finland: In Finland the Mortgage Society of Finland, a permanent building society, was founded in 1860. Since 2002 mortgage loans are handled by Suomen AsuntoHypoPankki, the licensed bank owned by the society.
Germany: In Germany there are 8 Bausparkassen of the Sparkassen-Finanzgruppe named Landesbausparkassen (LBS) and 12 private Bausparkassen, for example Schwäbisch Hall, Wüstenrot, Deutsche Bank Bauspar AG and so on.
United States: In the United States, savings and loan associations, as well as credit unions, have a similar organisation and purpose.
Other: See Cooperative banking.

Operational differences from banks

Roll numbers 

Because most building societies were not direct members of the UK clearing system, it was common for them to use a roll number to identify accounts rather than to allocate a six-digit sort-code and eight-digit account number to the BACS standards.

More recently, building societies have tended to obtain sort-code and account number allocations within the clearing system, and hence the use of roll numbers has diminished. When using BACS, one needs to enter roll numbers for the reference field and the building society's generic sort code and account number would be entered in the standard BACS fields.

See also

Banking in the United Kingdom
Mutual organisation
Mutualism

References

Further reading